Fereydun Gole (also spelled Fereydoun Goleh) (1941 – 22 October 2005) was an Iranian screenwriter, film director, and film editor. He was active in producing urban drama films throughout the 1970s, dealing with such issues as the social stratification of Tehran. His most famous film was Beehive. After he died in 2005, the 2006 documentary film Iran: A Cinematographic Revolution was dedicated to him.

Filmography

 The Night of the Angels (1968)
 Blue World (1969)
 Vahshi-e jangal (1971)
 Impious (1972)
 The Dagger (1972)
 Mashti Mamdali's Car (1974) - Writer
 Under the Skin of the Night (1974)
 The Mandrake (1975)
 Beehive (1975)
 Honeymoon (1976)

References

1941 births
2005 deaths
Iranian film directors
Iranian film editors
Iranian screenwriters
Burials at artist's block of Behesht-e Zahra
20th-century screenwriters